Kivukoni is an administrative ward located in Ilala District, Dar es Salaam Region of Tanzania. Kivikoni's name come from the  Swahili word meaning "a crossing place". The ward is bordered by Upanga East ward to the west, Kisutu ward to the southwest, and Kigamboni ward across the Kivukoni channel. Kivukoni ward is one of the most important wards in the country, as it is home to the Ikulu, which is the home of the president of Tanzania. Kivukoni ward is also home to the National Museum of Tanzania. According to the 2012 census, the ward had a total population of 6,742.

Economy
Kivukoni hosts a huge number of embassies for a small ward. Therefore, they support a number of businesses in the area. The ward is home to the Mzizima Fish Market and the Kivukoni Fish Market both are some of the largest fish markets in the country. Kivukoni is a hub for tourism and hosting some of the largest hotels in the country. Kivukoni hosts the historic Askari Monument.

Administration and neighborhoods 
The postal code for Kivukoni Ward is 11101. 
The ward is divided into the following neighborhoods: 
 Sea View, Kivukoni
 Kivukoni, Kivukoni

Education
The ward is home to these educational institutions: 
Bunge Primary School

Healthcare
The ward is home to the following health institutions:
Ocean Road Cancer Institute (private)
MNational Institute for Medical Research

Government offices
Kivukoni hosts the following government offices:
National Development Corporation (NDC)
The Bank of Tanzania
The Ministry of Constitutions and Legal Affairs
The Ministry of Education, Science and Technology
The Ministry of Energy and Minerals
The Ministry of Finance and Planning
The Ministry of Foreign Affairs
The Ministry of Health and Social Welfare
The Ministry of Lands and Human Settlements
The National Bureau of Statistics
The Prime Minister's Office
The Public Service Office and Good Governance
The State House of Tanzania known as the 'Ikulu' in Kiswahili language.
The Supreme Court of Tanzania
The Tanzania Buildings Agency
The Tanzania Investment Centre

References

Dar es Salaam
Ilala District
Wards of Dar es Salaam Region